Tarzan vs. Predator: At the Earth's Core is a four-issue comic book crossover limited series that was first published by Dark Horse Comics from January–June 1996. It was written by Walter Simonson, illustrated and inked by Lee Weeks, colored by Perry McNamee, lettered by Pat Brosseau and Vickie Williams, and edited by Mike Richardson and Peet Janes, with cover art by Weeks.

Plot

Tarzan winds up in a forest at the center of the Earth called Pellucidar. Seeing a group of Predators leave heaps of bodies in their wake,. Tarzan wages war against them to avenge the dead.

Collected editions
The series was collected into a trade paperback:

Tarzan vs. Predator: At the Earth's Core (Dark Horse Comics, 117 pages, October 1997)

See also
Tarzan (comics)
Predator (comics)

References

External links

Crossover comics
Intercompany crossovers
Predator (franchise) comics
Works based on Tarzan

Comics by Walt Simonson